Girl Talk discography may refer to:
The discography of Girl Talk (musical group)
The discography of Girl Talk (musician)